Sweden is a nation that has competed at the Hopman Cup tournament on eight occasions, their first appearance coming at the 1st annual staging of the event in 1989. They have been runner-up in one tournament  in  1999.

Players
This is a list of players who have played for Sweden at the Hopman Cup.

References

Hopman Cup teams
Hopman Cup
Hopman Cup